Padithal Mattum Podhuma is a 1962 Indian Tamil-language romantic drama film written and directed by A. Bhimsingh. Based on the 1961 novel Naa, by the Bengali writer Tarashankar Bandopadhyay, the film stars Sivaji Ganesan, K. Balaji, Savitri, M. R. Radha and Rajasulochana. It was released on 14 April 1962 and became a commercial success, running for more than 100 days at all centres in Tamil Nadu.

Plot 

Raju and Gopal are cousins who are very attached to each other. Gopal, the son of a zamindar and Mangalam, is uneducated, rough and loves hunting. Raju is the orphaned son of the zamindar's elder brother, raised by the zamindar and Mangalam as their first son, is educated, well mannered and cowardly.

The zamindar and Mangalam plan to get Raju and Gopal married and they seek the marriage broker Kailasam. Kailasam, a Saivite is married to Andal, a Vaishnavite and they have a daughter (Manorama). The couple often quarrel pertaining the difference between their beliefs which provides comic relief.

Kailasam suggests that Raju be married to the educated and wealthy Meena, daughter of Rao Bahadur and Gopal to be married to uneducated, country girl Seetha, sister of farmer Moorthy and daughter of a widow. It happens that the zamindar and Mangalam are unable to visit the brides' place, Kailasam arranges that Raju visit Seetha and Gopal to visit Meena. Gopal learns a few English words from Raju before leaving to Rao Bahadur's place. Rao Bahadur and Meena were impressed with Gopal and mistakenly conclude that he is well educated. A. Karunanidhi, who is the servant of Rao Bahadur, serves Gopal. At the same time, Raju sees Seetha and was very much impressed with her deeds and wishes to marry her.

Raju, who is a coward and unable to express himself to the zamindar and Mangalam, hatches a wicked plan by writing an anonymous poison letter to Rao Bahadur defaming himself as drunkard, womaniser and non-worthy and to Moorthy defaming Gopal as the same. Raju's plan works, where Rao Bahadur is irked by this and plans to have Gopal to be the groom for Menna and Moorthy plans to have Raju to be the groom for Seetha.

Much to Kailasam's persuasion to the zamindar, the wedding takes place where Raju is married to Seetha and Gopal marries Meena. Matters become serious on their first night, where Meena found out that Gopal is uneducated and blames Gopal as a liar for posing as an educated man before her. On the other hand, Raju and Seetha lead a happy life. The next day both couples leave to their in-laws place. Raju has no problems, but Gopal was embarrassed to face Meena's educated friends and leaves home without Meena. Upon reaching home, Gopal lies to the zamindar and Mangalam that Meena had to stay behind in order to sit for examinations. Rao Bahadur and Meena believe that the letter was sent by none other than Gopal, who liked Meena at first sight, cheats them as an educated and would like to have her instead of Raju. When Raju and Seetha arrive back, the zamindar and Mangalam lead them to Raju's father's house where the couples live happily. Gopal gets very much attached to Seetha and accepts her and treats her as his mother. Gopal continues on hunting and is assisted by A. Karunanidhi.

As time moves on, the zamindar calls in Kailasam to find out from Rao Bahadur when is he sending Meena down. Rao Bahadur angrily tells Kailasam and shows him the letter. Kailasam also believes in this and reveals the matter to the zamindar and Mangalam. Furious on hearing this, the zamindar hits Gopal and drives him away, but Mangalam believes that her son is innocent. Upon knowing this, Raju becomes restless and guilty that his deed led to a serious matter and tries to steal the letter from Gopal at night. Gopal wakes up suddenly and unsuspectingly questions, but Raju behaves under the pretext on searching for his books and unknowingly drops the letter on the floor while leaving the room. Seeing the lights were on, Mangalam enters Gopal's room and found out that the handwriting of the letter belongs to none other than Raju and gets very mad. Gopal urges Mangalam on promising not to let anyone know about this. In conjunction with this event, Gopal falls ill and Seetha nurses him back to be healthy again.

Raju and Seetha sets off to Rao Rahadur's place to compromise, where Bahadur's wife insists that Meena reunite with Gopal, but Rao Bahadur and Meena does not give in at all. Kailasam suggests that the zamindar to send a letter to Rao Bahadur stating that should Meena not live with Gopal, he would seek another bride for Gopal to remarry. Rao Bahadur forcefully sends Meena to Gopal's place. Meena, disgusted at the sight of Gopal, hurts him badly with insults. Gopal angrily leaves the room, gets drunk and returns to Meena and when a quarrel broke out again, whips her, which results in her fleeing back to her parents' place. Seetha, in dismay, orders Gopal to apologise to Meena and bring her back. Gopal goes over to Rao Bahadur's place and pleads to Meena to forgive him and to follow him back, but she refuses. Left with no option, Gopal tries to pull Meena forcefully when Rao Bahadur intervenes and hits Gopal badly with his walking stick.

Gopal leaves Rao Bahadur's house with much embarrassment. He is very much humiliated and the feeling of being unable to fulfill Seetha's orders makes him go berserk. On the way back, Gopal goes to the jungle and grabs the rifle from A. Karunanidhi, who is hunting and shoots whatever comes in his path. A. Karunanidhi rushes over to the zamindar's place and informs them of the situation. Raju, who feels guilty feeling that all these problems originated from his stupid deeds, goes over and tries to stop Gopal. In turn, Gopal who is devastated blames Raju for all his miseries. Seetha comes over and is shocked to see that Gopal is pointing the rifle at Raju. Seetha tries to stop him when Raju also tries to prevent Gopal from pulling the trigger, when the rifle shoots, killing Raju and Seetha faints. Before dying, Raju requests Gopal to promise not to inform regarding that he is the one who composed the letter. Gopal is arrested.

Mangalam falls ill and informs the zamindar, Rao Bahadur, his wife and Meena that the letter originated from Raju and not Gopal. Rao Bahadur and Meena feel guilty of their actions towards Gopal all the while and repent. Meanwhile, the public prosecutor proves to the judge that Gopal is guilty. Rao Bahadur and Meena rush to Seetha's home town, but Moorthy understands the situation, but is unable to help as Seetha avoids meeting anyone. Rao Bahadur and Meena plead to Seetha and she agrees to testify in court. Seetha's testimony saying that the rifle was handled by Seetha, Raju and Gopal  unsure of who pulled the trigger, gets Gopal released. Gopal and Meena live happily, while Seetha goes back to her home town.

Cast 
Sivaji Ganesan as Gopal
Savitri as Seetha
Rajasulochana as Meena
K. Balaji as Raju
R. Muthuraman as Moorthy
S. V. Ranga Rao as Rao Bahadur
S. V. Sahasranamam as the zamindar
P. Kannamba as Mangalam
M. V. Rajamma as Rao Bahadur's wife
M. R. Radha as Kailasam
C. K. Saraswathi as Aandal
A. Karunanidhi as servant of Rao Bahadur
Manorama as Kailasam's daughter
Radhabhai as Moorthy and Seetha's mother
O. A. K. Thevar as a lawyer (Guest role)
A. Veerappan (guest appearance in the song "Kaalam Seidha Komalithanatthil")

Production 
One song depicting Ganesan's character riding a horse was shot at Raj Bhavan.

Themes 
The underlying theme of the film is "how a deep friendship between cousins is affected due to both of them being besotted with a woman."

Soundtrack 
The music was composed by Viswanathan–Ramamoorthy. The song "Pon Ondru Kanden" is set in the Hindustani raga known as Brindavani Sarang.

Reception 
Kanthan of Kalki positively reviewed the film, saying watching it just once was not enough.

References

External links 
 

1962 romantic drama films
1960s Tamil-language films
1962 films
Fictional portrayals of the Tamil Nadu Police
Films about families
Films about fratricide and sororicide
Films based on Indian novels
Films based on works by Tarasankar Bandyopadhyay
Films directed by A. Bhimsingh
Films scored by Viswanathan–Ramamoorthy
Films set in Tiruchirappalli
Films shot in Chennai
Indian romantic drama films